Azra Akın (born 8 December 1981) is a Turkish-Dutch actress, dancer, model and beauty queen who was crowned Miss World 2002 in London on December 7, 2002.

Biography

Akın was born in Almelo, Netherlands, to Turkish parents. Her father (Nazım) and mother (Ayda) emigrated from Turkey to the Netherlands in 1971. Akın has one younger sister named Doruk. In 1998, at the age of 17, Akın was selected Elite Model of Turkey; she then participated in the Europe Elite Model competition in Nice, France, where she reached the final 15. She continued modelling in Germany for the German catalogue Otto.

In 2002, Azra won Star TV's Miss Turkey. Thus, she represented Turkey in the Miss World beauty pageant which was held on December 7, 2002, at Alexandra Palace, London, which she also won. Akin accepted the tiara and $156,000 prize from the previous year's winner Agbani Darego. During her reign, Akın travelled to the United Kingdom, Turkey, the United States, New Zealand, Ireland, Jamaica, Australia, China and many more countries.

In 2003, she won a gold medal when she participated in the British reality TV show The Games.

In 2004, Akın modelled for the postcards of the Eurovision Song Contest 2004 which were shown before each song.

In 2010, she won on the TV dance show Yok Boyle Dans, the Turkish version of Dancing With the Stars.

In 2017, she married Turkish male dancer and model Atakan Koru.

Filmography

References

External links

 (suspended site)
Azra Akın Pictures  at TurkishStarsDaily.com

1981 births
Living people
Dutch people of Turkish descent
Miss Turkey winners
Miss World 2002 delegates
Miss World winners
People from Almelo
Reality show winners
Turkish film actresses
Turkish female models
Turkish television actresses
Dutch emigrants to Turkey
Dutch beauty pageant winners
Turkish beauty pageant winners
20th-century Turkish actresses